The 1969 Ottawa Rough Riders finished in 1st place in the Eastern Conference with an 11–3 record and won the Grey Cup, repeating as Grey Cup Champions. Russ Jackson retired from the Canadian Football League after this game, having won three Grey Cup championships. He retired with the team record for total career passing yards with 24,952.

Preseason

Regular season

Standings

Schedule

Postseason

Playoffs

Grey Cup

Player stats

Passing

Awards and honours
 CFL's Most Outstanding Player Award – Russ Jackson (QB)
 CFL's Most Outstanding Canadian Award – Russ Jackson (QB)
 Grey Cup Most Valuable Player – Russ Jackson
 Jeff Russell Memorial Trophy – Russ Jackson
 Russ Jackson, QB, Eastern Division All-Star
 Russ Jackson, CFL Pass Attempts Leader
 Russ Jackson, Lionel Conacher Trophy
 Russ Jackson, Lou Marsh Trophy

CFL All-Stars 
 Russ Jackson, QB
 Vic Washington, RB
 Margene Adkins, SE
 Billy Joe Booth, DE
 Ken Lehmann, LB
 Jerry "Soupy" Campbell, LB
 Don Sutherin, DB

References

Ottawa Rough Riders seasons
James S. Dixon Trophy championship seasons
Grey Cup championship seasons
1969 Canadian Football League season by team